Aníbal Zapicán Falco (25 September 1893 — 30 April 1961) was a Uruguayan footballer who played as a defender for Nacional and Uruguay.

Career
Falco was born in Montevideo on 25 September 1893, although some sources claim Falco was born in 1888.

On 4 October 1908, Falco made his debut for Uruguay at the age of 15, playing in a 1–0 win against Argentina. In 1911, Falco retired from football, owing to a problem with his meniscus.

In 1937, Falco was named president of Nacional. On 14 June 1937, under Falco's presidency, Nacional purchased Estadio Gran Parque Central for $150,000.

References

1893 births
1961 deaths
Footballers from Montevideo
Uruguayan footballers
Uruguay international footballers
Uruguayan Primera División players
Club Nacional de Football players
Association football defenders